Graeme Lindsay Sturges (born 31 May 1955) is an Australian politician. He was a Labor Party member of the Tasmanian House of Assembly from 2002 to 2010 and 2011 to 2014, representing the Hobart-based electorate of Denison. He was elected twice before losing his seat in 2010, regained it in a countback following the resignation of David Bartlett in 2011, and retired at the 2014 election. He was the state Minister for Infrastructure from 2008 until 2010.

Early life
Sturges was born in Hobart. Prior to entering Parliament, he worked as the State Secretary for the Tasmanian branch of the Communications, Electrical and Plumbing Union.

Political career
Sturges entered Parliament when he was elected to the seat of Denison at the 2002 state election.

Sturges retained his political seat in the 2006 state election and continued his role as Government Whip whilst also remaining involved in community groups such as the RSPCA, Disabled Riders Association, Pensioners Union, French Car Club of Tasmania and the boxing community.

Sturges was appointed the Minister for Infrastructure in David Bartlett's cabinet following the resignation of the Premier, Paul Lennon.

During his time as Minister, Sturges attracted vigorous comment as to his handling of both rail infrastructure and ports as services either failed or were proven to have significant deterioration due to inactivity over many years. The absence of available Federal stimulus funding to alleviate these issues was also commented upon with Sturges admitting that the government had failed to apply for financial support.

During his time in parliament, Sturges was reported to have made several "gaffes". In March 2009, he was accused of misusing his position by raising an incident between his son and a bus driver with the management of Metro Tasmania. In another widely reported incident, Sturges reportedly shouted at a TT-Line security guard, stating "Don't you know who I am? I'll have your job." Sturges apologised to the guard, but later denied he had made the statements attributed to him, and said that his apology had been forced by the Premier's media advisors.

Sturges subsequently lost his seat in the Tasmanian state election in March 2010 gaining only 1,185 primary votes. He was then appointed Chairman of the Board of TasBuild.

In May 2011, former Premier David Bartlett resigned from parliament, triggering a "countback" (or recount of 2010 votes) for Denison. Of Labor's unsuccessful candidates at that election, Lisa Singh had been elected to the Australian Senate, leaving Sturges and Madeleine Ogilvie as the eligible Labor candidates. The recount took place on 26 May, and Sturges was re-elected with 5,362 votes to Ogilvie's 4,197.

References

External links
 
 Graeme Sturges' maiden speech to parliament

1955 births
Living people
Members of the Tasmanian House of Assembly
Australian Labor Party members of the Parliament of Tasmania
21st-century Australian politicians